Kiera Austin (born 26 August 1997) is an Australian netball player in the Suncorp Super Netball league, having previously playing for Giants Netball. She injure her ACL and was out for the whole 2021 season and after youngster Sophie Dwyer came in she looked elsewhere to play. The Vixens were quick to snatched her up after not offering Kaylia Stanton another contract.

Austin debuted in the Super Netball league for the Giants in 2018, having been a training partner for Canberra Giants in the Australian Netball League the previous year. She was a frequent member of underage state and national teams before debuting for the Giants, most notably earning a silver medal for Australia at the 2017 Netball World Youth Cup. Austin was selected for the Australian Fast5 team at the 2018 tournament in Melbourne and was later selected in the Australian Diamonds squad as a replacement for the injured Caitlin Bassett in January 2019.

References

External links
 Kiera Austin Interview – YouTube
 Netball Draft Central profile

Living people
1997 births
Australian netball players
Australia international netball players
Australia international Fast5 players
Netball players at the 2022 Commonwealth Games
Commonwealth Games gold medallists for Australia
Commonwealth Games medallists in netball
Netball players from New South Wales
Suncorp Super Netball players
Australian Netball League players
Netball New South Wales Waratahs players
Netball New South Wales Blues players
Canberra Giants (ANL) players
Giants Netball players
Melbourne Vixens players
New South Wales state netball league players
Medallists at the 2022 Commonwealth Games